Julus scanicus is a species of millipede from the Julidae family that can be found in Austria, Belarus, Czech Republic, Denmark,  Germany, Latvia, and Slovakia.

References

Julida
Animals described in 1925
Millipedes of Europe